Chorizanthe fimbriata, the fringed spineflower, is an annual plant in the family Polygonaceae, the buckwheats. It is a member of the genus Chorizanthe, the spineflowers, and is native to southern California and northern Baja California.

Distribution
The Chorizanthe fimbriata species is endemic to the San Jacinto Mountains (California) and the Peninsular Ranges in Southern California and Baja California, below .  It is found in coastal sage and montane chaparral and woodlands habitats.

Description
It bears small star-shaped 5-lobed reddish-purple flowers with yellow tubes.

Varieties
There are two varieties of the Fringed spineflower:
Chorizanthe fimbriata var. fimbriata
Chorizanthe fimbriata var. laciniata

References

Chorizanthe fimbriata at LBJ Wildflower Center

External links
Jepson Manual Treatment: Chorizanthe fimbriata
Chorizanthe fimbriata - Images at CalPhotos archive - & Plant form photo in full bloom, direct sun

fimbriata
Flora of California
Flora of Baja California
Natural history of the California chaparral and woodlands
Natural history of the Peninsular Ranges
Natural history of San Diego County, California
Taxa named by Thomas Nuttall